Jagdish Temple is a large Hindu temple in the middle of Udaipur in Rajasthan, just outside the royal palace. It has been in continuous worship since 1651. A big tourist attraction, the temple was originally called the temple of Jagannath Rai but is now called Jagdish-ji.  It is a major monument in Udaipur.

Overview

The Jagdish Temple is raised on a tall terrace and was completed in 1651. It attaches a double-storey Mandapa (hall) to a double-storey saandhara (with a covered ambulatory) sanctum. The mandapa has another storey tucked within its pyramidal samavarna (bellroof) while the hollow clustered spire over the sanctum contains two more, nonfunctional stories. To reach the main shrine, one must climb 32 marble steps, intercepted by a Brass image of Garuda in the end, being the mount (vahana) of God Vishnu. Shri Jagdish Temple is the most beautiful example of Hindu Iconography, consisting of three stories of hand carved stone, with a steeple nearly 79 feet high and is the largest temple of Udaipur.

Lanes taking off from many of the sheharpanah (city wall) converge on the Jagdish Temple. The most beautiful event in the temple is the annual Rath Yatra.
It was built by Maharana Jagat Singh in 1651. Jagdish Temple is a splendid example of either Māha Māru or Māru-Gurjara architecture, decorated by beautiful and ornate carvings. A short walk from the city palace will bring you to this temple. The temple sanctum has an idol of the deity Lord Jagannath, in local parlance of God Vishnu or God Krishna, carved out of a single black stone, resplendent with four arms, flowers and finery. Four smaller shrines, dedicated to Lord Ganesha, Surya, Goddess Shakti and Lord Shiva form a circle around the main shrine, housing the idol of Lord Vishnu. It is said that an estimated RS 1.5 million (or 1,500,000) ($22023. 21) was spent to construct the building in 1651.

Gallery

References

External links

 Sanctum and Deity
 Jagdish Temple Udaipur
 Temple Profile

Tourist attractions in Udaipur
Vishnu temples
Religious buildings and structures completed in 1651
Hindu temples in Udaipur
1651 establishments in the Mughal Empire
Māru-Gurjara architecture